Yunnanilus brevis, common name Inle loach,  is a species of ray-finned fish in the genus Yunnanilus, although some authorities place it in the genus Petruichthys. It is only found in Inle Lake and the adjacent He-Ho Plain in the Southern Shan States in Myanmar. It is a demersal fish which occurs in still and slow running waters as well as in a shallow lake, with dense submerged and floating vegetation.

References

brevis
Taxa named by George Albert Boulenger
Fish described in 1893